Australia A may refer to:
 Australia A cricket team
 Australia A national rugby union team